Frankland W. L. Miles was an American jurist and politician who served as presiding justice of the Roxbury District Court.

Early life
Miles was born in Brockton, Massachusetts. He attended grammar school in Chelsea, Massachusetts, and graduated from Chelsea High School. Miles attended Boston University's College of Liberal Arts, but dropped out to provide additional financial support for his family. For a time he worked at the Federal Reserve Bank of Boston. In 1913 he moved to Roxbury. During World War I he served in the United States Navy. Miles eventually decided to return to school and graduated from Suffolk Law School in 1923.

Judicial career
In 1934, Governor Frank G. Allen appointed Miles special justice of the Roxbury Municipal Court, the second busiest court in the Commonwealth after the Boston Municipal Court. In 1938 he was promoted to presiding justice by Governor Charles F. Hurley. Miles retired in 1951 due to deafness.

Political career
In 1936, Miles was a candidate for Lieutenant Governor of Massachusetts. However, at the Republican convention, supporters of defeated gubernatorial candidate Leverett Saltonstall were able to engineer his nomination for Lieutenant Governor. In 1950, Miles was a candidate for Governor of Massachusetts. He finished fifth in the Republican primary with 10% of the vote. In 1958 Miles was the Republican nominee for the District 1 seat Massachusetts Governor's Council. He lost to Democrat Ernest C. Stasiun 55% to 45%.

Personal life
In 1920, Miles married Louis Grother of Roxbury. They had two children. He was a fan of the Boston Braves baseball team and played with some of the players in exhibition games. Following his retirement, Miles resident in Plymouth and Canton, Massachusetts. He raised his two granddaughters, Stephanie and Victoria, while living in Chestnut Hill, MA. He died on January 14, 1974, at Massachusetts General Hospital. He was 76 years old.

References

1974 deaths
Massachusetts lawyers
Massachusetts Republicans
Massachusetts state court judges
People from Canton, Massachusetts
People from Plymouth, Massachusetts
Politicians from Boston
Politicians from Chelsea, Massachusetts
Suffolk University Law School alumni